Old Baldy may refer to:

Places 
One of a list of peaks named Baldy
Bald Head Lighthouse, in Bald Head, North Carolina
Mount San Antonio, a summit in Southern California also called "Mount Baldy"
Old Baldy (Lynch, Nebraska), a hill visited by the Lewis and Clark Expedition
Old Baldy (Fisher Range), a mountain in Alberta, Canada

Animals 
Old Baldy (horse), belonged to General George G. Meade in the American Civil War

Events 
Battle of Old Baldy, a series of engagements in the Korean War

See also
Baldy Mountain
Bald Mountain (disambiguation)
Baldy (disambiguation)